Hollymount Carramore GAA is a Gaelic Athletic Association club in south County Mayo, Ireland. The club is an amalgamation of the two former clubs of Hollymount and Carramore , Hollymount having won 3 Senior championships in the 1990s. Hollymount-Carramore currently compete in the Mayo Intermediate Football Championship.

From 1989 to 1991, Hollymount won every championship match they played in Mayo, beginning with the 1989 Intermediate campaign (when they won the title) and then winning successive Senior titles.

History
Located between Ballinrobe and Claremorris the pitch is called St Coman's Park.

Achievements
 All-Ireland Intermediate Club Football Championship: Runner-Up 2016
 Mayo Intermediate Football Championship: 2015
 Connacht Intermediate Club Football Championship: 2015

Notable players
 Noel Stagg

References

External sources
Club Website

Gaelic football clubs in County Mayo
Gaelic games clubs in County Mayo